UN numbers from UN2001 to UN2100 as assigned by the United Nations Committee of Experts on the Transport of Dangerous Goods are as follows:


UN 2001 to UN 2100

See also 
Lists of UN numbers

References

External links
ADR Dangerous Goods, cited on 7 May 2015.
UN Dangerous Goods List from 2015, cited on 7 May 2015.
UN Dangerous Goods List from 2013, cited on 7 May 2015.

Lists of UN numbers